The São Paulo Museum of Art (or ) is an art museum located on Paulista Avenue in the city of São Paulo, Brazil. It is well known for its headquarters, a 1968 concrete and glass structure designed by Lina Bo Bardi, whose main body is supported by two lateral beams over a  freestanding space. It is considered a landmark of the city and a main symbol of modern Brazilian architecture.

The museum is a non-profit institution founded in 1947 by Assis Chateaubriand and Pietro Maria Bardi. MASP distinguished itself for many important initiatives concerning museology and art education in Brazil, as well as for its pioneering role as a cultural center. It was also the first Brazilian museum interested in post-World War II art.

The museum is internationally recognized for its collection of European art, considered the finest in Latin America and all Southern Hemisphere. It also houses an important collection of Brazilian art, prints and drawings, as well as smaller collections of African and Asian art, antiquities, decorative arts, and others, amounting to more than 8,000 pieces. MASP also has one of the largest art libraries in the country. The entire collection was placed to the Brazilian National Heritage list by Brazil's Institute of History and Art.

History

General context

At the end of the 1940s, the Brazilian economy was going through large structural changes as a result of accelerating industrialization. The city of São Paulo subsequently established itself as the most important industrial hub in the country. Prior to that time, São Paulo's role in modern art had been marked by the Week of Modern Art of 1922. Despite the importance this event had enjoyed in the 1920s, Modernism wouldn't draw much attention of city dwellers and institutions in the following decades. There was only one art museum in São Paulo, the Pinacoteca do Estado, solely devoted to Academic art, and a commercial gallery.

Assis Chateaubriand, founder and owner of the Diários Associados, or "Associated Daily Press", the largest media and press conglomerate of Brazil at the time, was one of the most influential individuals of this period. In the late 1940s, Chateaubriand started a campaign to acquire masterpieces to form an art collection of international renown in Brazil. He intended to host the museum in Rio de Janeiro, but ultimately chose São Paulo, where he believed it would be easier to gather the necessary funds, since this city was enjoying a very prosperous moment. At the same time, the European art market had been deeply influenced by the end of World War II, making it possible to acquire fine artworks for reasonable prices.

With the help of Pietro Maria Bardi, an Italian professor, critic, art dealer and former owner of galleries in Milan and Rome, Chateaubriand created a "Museum of Classical and Modern Art". Though he initially planned to lead the project for only a year, Bardi dedicated the rest of his life to it. He moved to Brazil together with his wife, the architect Lina Bo Bardi, and brought along his library and his private art collection.

Beginnings (1947–1957)

The museum was inaugurated and opened to the public  on 2 October 1947, displaying the first acquisitions, among them canvases by Picasso and Rembrandt. In these first years of activity, the museum was located on the upper floors of the Diarios Associados headquarters in the Centro neighborhood of São Paulo. Architect Lina Bo Bardi was in charge of adapting the building to the needs of the museum, dividing it into four distinct areas: an art gallery, a didactic exposition room about the history of art, a temporary exhibition room and an auditorium.

MASP was the first Brazilian art museum interested in acquiring works of modern art. The museum quickly became a meeting point for artists, students and intellectuals, attracted not only by its holdings, but also by the workshops and art courses it offered.

In the 1950s, the museum created the Institute of Contemporary Art (offering workshops of engraving, drawing, painting, sculpture, dance and industrial design), the Publicity School (presently Superior School of Propaganda and Marketing), organizing debates about cinema and literature and creating a youth orchestra and a ballet company. The courses were frequently given by important names of the Brazilian artistic scene, such as the painters Lasar Segall and Roberto Sambonet, the architects Gian Carlo Palanti and Lina Bo Bardi, the sculptor August Zamoyski, and the motion-picture technician Alberto Cavalcanti.

Along with the amplification of the educational program, the museum expanded its collection and began to be recognized internationally. Between 1953 and 1957, a selection of 100 masterpieces housed in the museum traveled throughout European museums, such as Musée de l'Orangerie (Paris) and the Tate Gallery (London), in a series of exhibitions organized with the intent of consolidating the collection. In 1957, the collection was also displayed in the United States at the Metropolitan Museum of Art in New York City and in the Toledo Museum of Art. The following year, the holdings of MASP were exhibited at other Brazilian venues, such as the Museu Nacional de Belas Artes, in Rio de Janeiro. This established the museum on a global level.

Consolidation of the museum

The collection's rising growth and importance soon required the construction of a building to headquarter the museum. With that purpose, the São Paulo City Hall donated a plot of ground, previously occupied by the Belvedere Trianon – a traditional meeting point of the Paulistano wealthy, which had been demolished in 1951 – to host the first edition of São Paulo Art Biennial. The ground on Paulista Avenue had been donated to the City Hall with the condition that the view to the downtown area and the valley of the Nove de Julho Avenue be preserved.

The new MASP building was the brainchild of Lina Bo Bardi. To preserve the required view of the downtown area, Bardi idealized a building suspended above ground, supported by four massive rectangular columns made of concrete. The construction is considered to be unique worldwide for its peculiarity: the main body of the building stands on four lateral supporting pillars, generating a free area of 74 meters underneath the sustained building. Constructed between 1956 and 1968, the new site of the museum was inaugurated on 7 November by Queen Elizabeth II of the United Kingdom during her visit to Brazil.

Assis Chateaubriand would not get to see the inauguration of the new building. He died months before, a victim of thrombosis. The media empire which he developed had also been facing difficulties since the beginning of the 1960s. Growing debts and the competition in the media market by Roberto Marinho's press conglomerate – caused the scarcity of the funds which had permitted the gathering of the collection.

The overthrow of Diários Associados and the death of its founder made the government intervene and pay for some of the debts contracted with foreign institutions. During the government of president Juscelino Kubitschek, Caixa Econômica Federal granted a loan to honor the financial obligations of the institution and secured the loan with its art collections. Years later, in the 1970s, the museum's debt with the Brazilian government was negotiated and paid off.

In 1969, in response to a request by the museum, the Brazilian Institute for Historic and Artistic Heritage (IPHAN) registered MASP's holdings as part of the national heritage.

In the 1970s the museum gained fame in the Eastern Hemisphere by organizing many exhibitions using selected works of its collection at Japanese museums. In 1973, the collection was presented at the Ministry of Foreign Relations in Brasília. MASP's collection was presented again in Japan in 1978/79, 1982/83, 1990/91, and 1995. In 1992, works of the French school and Brazilian landscapes were exhibited in the Museo Nacional de Bellas Artes, in Santiago, Chile, and in the Biblioteca Luís Angel Aragón, in Bogotá.

In 2021, plans to construct a 14-story extension with an underground link to its current building were announced, to be completed by 2024.

The building

Construction on the present building of the museum began in 1957, and the building was inaugurated in 1968. MASP is famous for its remarkable brutalist structure, and it is considered one of the landmarks of the Brazilian modern architecture. The building is located on the former site of Belvedere Trianon on Paulista Avenue, from which it was possible to see the Centro of São Paulo and the Cantareira Mountains beyond. José Borges de Figueiredo, the investor who sold the plot of ground to the City Hall, wrote a non-binding letter to the administration, asking that it be preserved as a "public place in perpetuity". While in the following years multiple proposed projects ignored his wish, the architect Lina Bo Bardi and engineer José Carlos Figueiredo Ferraz ultimately conceived an underground block as well as a suspended structure. The structure stands eight meters above the ground, supported by four pillars connected by two huge concrete beams. The building inaugurated the so-called protected reinforced concrete technique in Brazil.

The building's installations and finishing are homely, as Lina Bo herself described: "Concrete visible, whitewash, a flagstone flooring covering the great Civic Hall, tempered glass, plastic walls. Industrial black rubber flooring covering inner spaces. The belvedere is a 'square', with plants and flowers around, paved with parallelepipeds, according to Iberian-Brazilian tradition. There are also water spaces, small water mirrors with aquatic plants. […] I didn't search for beauty. I've searched for freedom". In 2003, the building was also registered as national patrimony by Brazilian Institute for Historic and Artistic Heritage.

In the museographic area, Lina Bo Bardi also innovated by using tempered crystal sheets leaned on concrete blocks bases as display supports for the paintings. The intention is to imitate the position of the canvas on the painter's easel, but it also has roots in interwar Italian exhibition design. In the reverse of these supports, which are not used anymore, there were labels with information about the painter and the work. Paradoxically, the museum abandoned this model of exhibition at the end of the 1990s, when the method was beginning to be noticed and implemented by foreign institutions and artists.

Between 1996 and 2001, the current administration of the museum undertook a vast and controversial reform. Despite the indispensable restoration of the general structure, dramatic changes implemented by the architect and former director of the institution Julio Neves included the substitution of the original floor conceived by Lina Bo, the installation of a second elevator, the construction of a third underground floor, and the substitution of the water mirrors for gardens. Some architects allege that the reform caused a profound distortion of Lina's original project.

The collection

The formation of the collection

The main body of the collection was assembled between 1947 and 1960. Pietro Maria Bardi, formerly owner of commercial galleries in Milan and Rome, was in charge of searching and selecting the works which should be acquired, while Chateaubriand looked for donors and patrons, trying to tempt potential ones with banquets and lavish ceremonies. 

These methods drew lots of criticism, as was the fact that the museum acquired works of art without the proper corroboration of authenticity. This impression was endorsed by the fact that the museum was at the time, just after WWII, one of the major buyers of art in the international market. Unlike other institutions, whose acquisitions depended on approval of a curators council, the São Paulo Museum of Art usually acquired its pieces quickly, sometimes by telegram. The works of art were generally acquired at Christie's, Marlborough, Sotheby's, Knoedler, Seligman and Wildenstein.

At the end of the 1960s, Chateaubriand's press conglomerate was facing troubles, with growing debts and competition from Roberto Marinho's media companies. The financial difficulties of Diários Associados caused the decline of the museum's financial resources. Consequently, the museum then added to its collection through spontaneous donations of artists, companies and private collectors.

Overview of the collection
The São Paulo Museum of Art collection is considered the largest and more comprehensive collection of Western art in Latin America. Among the 8,000 works of the museum, the collection of European paintings, sculptures, drawings, engravings, and decorative arts stands out. Early modern French and Italian schools of painting are broadly represented, forming the main body of the collection, followed by Spanish, Portuguese, Flemish, Dutch, English and German masters.

The museum also keeps a significant collection of Brazilian art and Brasiliana, which shows the development of Brazilian art from 17th century to the present. The museum also possesses important holdings of Latin American art and North American art.

On a smaller scale, the museum's holdings include representative objects of many periods and distinct non-Western civilizations – such as African and Asian arts – and others which stand out for their technological, archaeological, historic, and artistic relevance, like the select collections of Egyptian, Etruscan, Greek and Roman antiquities, besides other artifacts of Pre-Columbian cultures and medieval European art.

Paintings

Italian school

Tiziano Vecelli (known as Titian) – 1 painting
Tintoretto, Jacopo Comin – 2 paintings
Giambattista Pittoni – 1 painting, Dioniso e Ariadne
Sanzio, Raffaello – 1 Painting, Resurrection of Christ
Botticelli, Sandro – 1 painting, Virgin and Child with the Infant St. John the Baptist
Mantegna, Andrea – 1 painting
Perugino, Pietro −1 painting
Allori, Alessandro – 1 painting
d'Antonio, Biagio – 1 painting
Bassano, Jacopo (Jacopo dal Ponte) – 1 painting
Bellini, Giovanni – 1 painting, Madonna Willys
Bordone, Paris – 1 painting
Guercino – 1 painting
di Cosimo, Piero – 1 painting
Francia, Francesco (Francesco Raibolini) – 1 painting
Giampietrino (Gian Pietro Rizzi) – 1 painting
Nelli, Ottaviano – 1 painting
Reni, Guido – 1 painting
Saraceni, Carlo – 1 painting
del Sellaio, Jacopo – 1 painting

Brazil and the Americas
de Almeida Júnior, José Ferraz – 6 paintings
do Amaral, Tarsila – 2 paintings
Américo de Figueiredo e Mello, Pedro – 2 paintings
Calixto de Jesus, Benedito – 3 paintings
Di Cavalcanti, Emiliano – 2 paintings
Malfatti, Anita – 2 paintings
Meirelles de Lima, Victor – 4 paintings
Portinari, Candido – 17 paintings
do Rêgo Monteiro, Vicente – 2 paintings
Rivera, Diego – 2 paintings
Segall, Lasar – 2 paintings
Stuart, Gilbert – 1 painting
Volpi, Alfredo – 1 painting
Visconti, Eliseu – 2 paintings

French school

Bonnard, Pierre – 1 painting
Cézanne, Paul – 5 paintings
Chardin, Jean-Baptiste-Siméon – 1 painting
Clouet, François – 1 painting
Corot, Jean-Baptiste-Camille – 5 paintings
Courbet, Gustave – 2 paintings
Debret, Jean-Baptiste – 1 painting
Degas (Hilaire-Germain-Edgar De Gas) – 3 paintings
Delacroix, Eugène – 4 paintings
Drouais, François-Hubert – 1 painting
Fragonard, Jean-Honoré – 2 paintings
Gauguin, Paul – 2 paintings
Gobert, Pierre – 1 painting
Ingres, Jean-Auguste-Dominique – 3 paintings
Lemoyne, François – 1 painting
Léger, Fernand – 1 painting
Manet, Édouard – 4 paintings
Matisse, Henry – 2 paintings
Mignard, Pierre (and workshop) – 1 painting
Modigliani, Amedeo – 5 paintings
Monet, Claude – 2 paintings, including Boating on the River Epte
Nattier, Jean-Marc – 4 paintings 
Pater, Jean-Baptiste – 1 painting
Picasso, Pablo Ruiz – 3 paintings, including Portrait of Suzanne Bloch
Poussin, Nicolas – 1 painting
Renoir, Pierre-Auguste – 12 paintings, including Pink and Blue
de Toulouse-Lautrec, Henri – 10 paintings
Vestier, Antoine – 1 painting
Vuillard, Édouard – 3 paintings

Spanish school
El Greco (Domenikos Theotokopoulos) – 2 paintings
Goya y Lucientes, Francisco – 4 paintings
Murillo, Bartolomé Esteban – 1 painting
Velázquez, Diego Rodríguez de Silva y – 1 painting, the Portrait of the Count-Duke of Olivares
Zurbarán, Francisco de – 2 paintings

Dutch, Flemish and German schools

Bosch, Hieronymus – 1 painting
Cranach, Lucas (the Elder) – 1 painting
Dornicke, Jan van – 1 painting
Dyck, Anthony van – 2 paintings
Hals, Frans – 3 paintings
Holbein, Hans (the Younger) – 1 painting
Massys, Quentin – 1 painting, Ill-Matched Marriage 
Memling, Hans – 1 painting
Oolen, Jan van – 1 painting
Post, Frans – 5 paintings
Rembrandt – 1 painting, Portrait of a Young Man with a Golden Chain
Rubens, Peter Paul(and workshop) – 1 painting
Ruysdael, Salomon van – 1 painting
Van Gogh, Vincent – 5 paintings

English school
Constable, John – 1 painting
Gainsborough, Thomas – 3 paintings
Hogarth, William – 1 painting
Lawrence, Thomas (and workshop) – 2 paintings
Raeburn, Henry – 1 painting
Reynolds, Joshua – 1 painting
Romney, George – 1 painting
Turner, J. M. W. – 1 painting

The museum also has some small collections of photographs, costumes and textiles, kitsch objects, etc.

Theft 
On 20 December 2007, around 5:09 am, three men invaded MASP and took two paintings, considered to be among the most valuable of the museum: O Lavrador de Café (The Coffee Farmer), by Cândido Portinari, and the Portrait of Suzanne Bloch by Pablo Picasso. The whole action took about three minutes. Art experts estimated value of the paintings at about 55 or 56 million dollars. The paintings were recovered by the Brazilian police on 8 January 2008, in the city of Ferraz de Vasconcelos, in Greater São Paulo.

Gallery

See also 

 Museum of Contemporary Art, University of São Paulo
 Ema Gordon Klabin Cultural Foundation
 Eva Klabin Foundation
 MASP Antique Market
 Museu Nacional de Belas Artes
 Pinacoteca do Estado de São Paulo

References

External links
 Official website
Virtual tour of the São Paulo Museum of Art provided by Google Arts & Culture

 
Art museums established in 1947
1947 establishments in Brazil